Thero Setsile (born 8 October 1995) is a Botswanan international footballer who plays for Jwaneng Galaxy as a midfielder.

Career
Setsile has played club football for ECCO City Green, Sankoyo Bush Bucks, Jwaneng Galaxy and TS Galaxy.

He made his international debut for Botswana in 2017. In November 2019 he was one of four Botswana international players dropped from the national team after they had been drinking alcohol.

References

1995 births
Living people
Botswana footballers
Botswana international footballers
ECCO City Green players
Sankoyo Bush Bucks F.C. players
Jwaneng Galaxy F.C. players
TS Galaxy F.C. players
Association football midfielders
Botswana expatriate footballers
Botswana expatriates in South Africa
Expatriate soccer players in South Africa